Circular DNA is DNA that forms a closed loop and has no ends.  Examples include:
 Plasmids, mobile genetic elements
 cccDNA, formed by some viruses inside cell nuclei
 Circular bacterial chromosomes
 Mitochondrial DNA (mtDNA)
 Chloroplast DNA (cpDNA), and that of other plastids
Extrachromosomal circular DNA (eccDNA)

See also 
 Inverse polymerase chain reaction (Inverse PCR), technique for finding unknown DNA flanking known DNA
 Effect of circular DNA on gel electrophoresis
 Cyclic nucleotide
 Cyclic adenosine monophosphate (cAMP)
 Cyclic guanosine monophosphate (cGMP)
 Circular RNA
 Cyclic peptide